Blind Island Marine State Park is a public recreation area consisting of the entirety of Blind Island, a  island at the entrance to Blind Bay on Shaw Island in San Juan County, Washington. It is part of the San Juan Islands National Monument. The island lies one-third of a mile west of the Shaw Island ferry terminal and has  of saltwater shoreline. The park is cooperatively managed by the U.S. Bureau of Land Management and Washington State Parks.

History
In the late 1800s, a man named John Fox homesteaded the island and built a small house and storage sheds. Fox was an immigrant from Germany, where he had made his living as a fisherman. After his divorce from Katherine Fox Dickman, he moved to the island where he lived as a fisherman and tilled a small garden spot, evidence of which still remains today. Fox's son, also named John Fox, died around 1960 after living alone on the island. The elder Fox is buried on the island. The Foxes dug several holes into the rock, evidently to be used as cisterns. There is a small spring, around which a concrete retainer was built that is still in place. The water is unsafe to drink.

The island became a state park in 1970 under lease from the BLM. All buildings were removed in 1972 due to their unsafe conditions.

Activities and amenities
As a stop on the Cascadia Marine Trail, the island's campsites are restricted to visitors arriving in non-motorized watercraft. Activities include observing the abundant wildlife and frequently passing ferries.

See also

References

External links

Blind Island Marine State Park Washington State Parks and Recreation Commission
Blind Island Brochure and Map U.S. Bureau of Land Management

Parks in San Juan County, Washington
State parks of Washington (state)
Protected areas established in 1970
1970 establishments in Washington (state)
San Juan Islands
Uninhabited islands of Washington (state)